S.K. Ojha (16 October 1921 – 4 October 1980) was an Indian film director. He was educated at Kanpur. He directed his first film at the age of twenty five. The film was "Doli", produced by the renowned film sound recordist Mr. P N Arora.

Filmography

As Director
Films directed by S. K. Ojha:

As Producer

As Story Writer

As Executive Producer
 Agni Rekha (1973) Written & Directed by Mahesh Kaul. *Sanjeev Kumar and Sharda. Music Kalyanji Anandji

References

External links
 

1921 births
1980 deaths
Film directors from Uttar Pradesh
Hindi-language film directors
People from Hathras
20th-century Indian film directors